Bosshardt is a surname. Notable people with the surname include:

Alida Bosshardt (1913–2007), Dutch Salvation Army officer
Johann Caspar Bosshardt (1823–1887), Swiss history painter
Rudolf Alfred Bosshardt (1897–1993), British missionary to China with the China Inland Mission

See also
Bosshard